Slobodan "Krcun" Penezić (2 July 1918 – 6 November 1964) was a Yugoslav communist politician who served as Prime Minister and Minister of Internal Affairs of the Socialist Republic of Serbia. During his heyday, he was the Secret Police chief in Serbia.

He was also notable for leading the arrest of Draža Mihailović and for being awarded the Order of the People's Hero (on 5 July 1952).

Career
Penezić was a member of the Central Committee of the League of Communists of Yugoslavia, a member of the League of Communists of Serbia Executive Committee and was also chairman of the Executive Council of the Serbian parliament.

Death
Penezić's death cleared the way for plans by Josip Broz Tito to limit the power of secret police chief Aleksandar Ranković at a crucial party congress.

His wife was among those who doubted the circumstances of his death, but his son considered finding out hard facts nearly impossible.

References

1918 births
1964 deaths
Politicians from Užice
Yugoslav Partisans members
Interior ministers of Serbia
Government ministers of Serbia
League of Communists of Yugoslavia politicians
League of Communists of Serbia politicians
Central Committee of the League of Communists of Yugoslavia members
Road incident deaths in Yugoslavia
Road incident deaths in Serbia
Death conspiracy theories
Burials at Belgrade New Cemetery
Recipients of the Order of the People's Hero